Wonderful Mentality (French: Belle mentalité) is a 1953 French comedy film directed by André Berthomieu and starring Jean Richard, Michèle Philippe and Jean Martinelli.

The film's sets were designed by the art director Raymond Nègre.

Synopsis
Honoré, a valet, has an extremely logical mind and is unable to tell a lie. This comes in very fortunate for the family he works for.

Cast

References

Bibliography 
 Rège, Philippe. Encyclopedia of French Film Directors, Volume 1. Scarecrow Press, 2009.

External links 
 

1953 films
French comedy films
1953 comedy films
1950s French-language films
Films directed by André Berthomieu
French black-and-white films
1950s French films